Maud de Lacy, Baroness Geneville (1230 – 11 April 1304) was a Norman-Irish noblewoman and wealthy heiress who inherited half the estates of her grandfather Walter de Lacy, Lord of Meath, upon his death in 1241. The lordships of Trim and Ludlow passed to her second husband Sir Geoffrey de Geneville, 1st Baron Geneville by right of his marriage to her; although she helped to rule and administer the estates in an equal partnership. She is sometimes referred to as Matilda de Lacy.


Family 
Maud (otherwise Matilda) was born in Dublin, Ireland in 1230, the youngest child of Gilbert de Lacy of Ewyas Lacy and Isabel Bigod, daughter of Hugh Bigod the Earl of Norfolk and his wife Matilda (Maud), daughter of William Marshall the Earl of Pembroke. Her paternal grandparents were Walter de Lacy and Margaret de Braose, daughter of Maud de Braose, who was walled up alive by King John of England. Her maternal grandparents were Hugh Bigod, 3rd Earl of Norfolk and Maud Marshal. She had an elder brother, Walter and sister Margery. On 25 December 1230, the year of her birth, Maud's father died, leaving her mother a widow at the age of eighteen. Less than four years later on 12 April 1234, her mother married again; he was John FitzGeoffrey, Lord of Shere in Surrey, England, and Justiciar of Ireland. Maud had six  younger half-siblings from her mother's second marriage to John.

In early 1241, Maud's brother Walter died. He was in his early teens. When their grandfather Walter de Lacy died shortly afterwards on 24 February, Maud and her sister, Margery inherited his vast estates and lordships in Ireland, Herefordshire, and the Welsh Marches. Maud and Margery both received a moiety of Ewyas Lacy in Herefordshire, and a share of the lordship with the taxes and revenues that attached to it.

Marriages and issue 
On an unknown date, Maud married her first husband Pierre de Genève, son of Humbert, Count of Genève, and a relative of Eleanor of Provence. He was one of the "Savoyards" who had arrived in England in the retinue of Queen Eleanor when she married King Henry III. The marriage produced a son and a daughter whose names were not recorded. Pierre died in 1249, and sometime before 8 August 1252, Maud married her second husband, another "Savoyard", Sir Geoffrey de Geneville, Seigneur of Vaucouleurs( c.1226- 21 October 1314), son of Simon de Joinville and Beatrix d'Auxonne. Both Maud's marriages and the marriage of her sister, Margery were personally arranged by King Henry III to ensure that the estates they inherited from their grandfather were retained in the hands of those known to be trusted servants of the Crown.

Maud died at Trim Castle on 11 April 1304 at the age of seventy-four. Her husband Geoffrey died ten years later.  Their son Piers had died in 1292, leaving Joan as heiress-apparent to the estates and lordships. She succeeded as the suo jure 2nd Baroness Geneville on 21 October 1314.

Notes

References

 The Complete Peerage 

1230 births
1304 deaths
Normans in Ireland
Maud
English baronesses
Anglo-Norman women
13th-century Irish women
13th-century Irish people
14th-century Irish women
14th-century Irish people